Terry Virgo (born 20 February 1940) is a prominent leader in the British New Church Movement, formerly known as the House Church Movement.  He is the founder of the Newfrontiers family of neocharismatic evangelical churches, which has grown into an international apostolic network of over 1500 churches in more than 70 nations. He is a leading  Calvinist Charismatic.  He has five grown up children and twelve grandchildren.

Early life
Virgo was born and raised in Brighton, on the English South Coast. He was not brought up in a believing home, though he was sent to Sunday school at both a high Anglican church, and a low Presbyterian Church, where he "never heard the gospel."  When Virgo was 16 his sister became a believer, and through her he too was touched by God: he "got down on his knees and began to weep." At first he went to a formal Anglican Church, but when he visited Holland Road Baptist Church, he said "the moment I went through the door, I realised that these people had got what I had."  The pastor, EG Rudman, exercised a great influence on Virgo at a formative stage."  Rudman was a supporter of the Keswick Convention. Virgo was also influenced by Denis Clarke and Campbell MacAlpine.

Ministry
As a young pastor, Virgo was influenced by the Charismatic Movement. Having become disillusioned by his experience in traditional UK churches, he sought to direct his church toward what he considered its New Testament "charismatic roots." He was influenced in this pursuit by the teaching of the British Restorationist Arthur Wallis, who believed that a return of the charismatic gifts (such as prophecy and speaking in tongues) to the traditional denominations was not sufficient and that a more thorough restoration of church life to a New Testament pattern was necessary. Particular attention was initially given to the Ephesians 4 ministries of apostle, prophet, evangelist, shepherd and teacher, and over time a broader understanding of the nature of church life began to emerge. He has been called a sort of elder statesman of Calvinist continuationists.

Newfrontiers
The network of churches that related to Terry Virgo originally used the name Coastlands, and then New Frontiers International, finally settling on Newfrontiers. By the end of the 1990s Newfrontiers had had become the largest Apostolic network in the UK. William K Kay believes that significant numbers of Baptist churches joining the movement, and avoiding scandals and other negative events contributed to this hegemony.

Newfrontiers has used week-long conferences, known as "Bible weeks" as an important strategy for growth and the development of its identity. Known originally as Downs Bible Weeks, running for a decade from 1979, they were later called Stoneleigh. The Downs Bible Week ran for a decade from 1979 and gathered up to 20,000 people at its height. Expositional Bible teaching from its main leaders, or Apostolic Team and lively worship were major features of the event.

In January 2011 it was announced that Terry would move from Church of Christ the King in Brighton to help lead a Newfrontiers church in Kingston-upon-Thames, London. The same year, Virgo handed over leadership of Newfrontiers to a score of leaders worldwide, each of whom is described as being "free to develop his own strategies, training programs, and gospel advance", marking a significant change in the leadership structure of Newfrontiers.

Theological views

Reformed and charismatic theology
Terry Virgo is a conservative Calvinist. He said, 'Anyone in newfrontiers would know how much we treasure these doctrines.  I am not sure that someone would feel they couldn't join us if they were not reformed.  We have never said you have to be reformed to belong. But it is widely known and understood outside our circles that we are reformed and charismatic.  That's how people see us. I have often said that I don't know how people who don't fully believe in the sovereignty of God can sleep peacefully at night.'

Terry Virgo is a charismatic and thus believes that miraculous gifts such as prophecy and healing are for today.  In an interview he said, 'We feel we are a bit unique in the emphasis on both the charismatic and yet also reformed theology which we hold dear. Often reformed teachers have tended to be cessationist and often Charismatics have tended to be Arminians — so we have been unusual…  We do have excellent fellowship with Sovereign Grace Ministries led by C.J. Mahaney and certainly we have a great deal in common with them.'

Baptism in the Holy Spirit
Terry Virgo believes that baptism in the Holy Spirit is a distinct/separate experience from conversion. He thus differs from many evangelicals on this matter, including John Wimber's tentative view and Wayne Grudem. Virgo would say that the Samaritan experience in Acts 8 and the Ephesian disciples' experience in Acts 19 make it clear that baptism in the Holy Spirit does not always happen 'automatically' upon conversion.

Regarding the common argument that one cannot get doctrine from narrative passages like in Acts but must rely on didactic portions of scripture like the Epistles, Virgo says, 'that is wrong', and simply quotes 2 Tim 3:16 which says that "all scripture… is profitable for… doctrine…". He thus differs with 'Third Wave' charismatics who typically hold that baptism in the Holy Spirit happens upon conversion.

Virgo does not believe that tarrying meetings are necessary (as taught in some Pentecostal circles), he says: 'After the day of Pentecost no one is ever told to wait [for the baptism in Holy Spirit]…  The waiting is only until the day of Pentecost…'

Apostles
Terry Virgo, along with many British New Church Movement leaders, believes the Bible teaches that the ministry of an apostle is for today, and did not end with the death of the first Apostles. He thinks the widespread belief amongst Evangelicals that apostles are no longer for today is largely a result of the Reformers opposition to the Roman Catholic notion of apostolic succession which has strongly influenced the Evangelical view ever since. He says: 'We do believe in the ongoing role of apostles and all Ephesians 4 gifts.  We do recognize that of course the original twelve Apostles were unique, and that the canon of Scripture is complete. We do see the need however, today, for master builders in helping to establish foundations in local churches and for fathers in the faith." Church historian Derryck Lovegrove has observed that Virgo has "enjoyed a powerful personal hegemony," referring to Virgo's influence both within his own movement, and the wider British New Church Movement.

Terry Virgo thinks that restoration of apostles is the most important and distinctive feature of "Restoration" as defined by Andrew Walker. Terry is widely recognised as an apostle within this movement.

Water baptism
Terry Virgo teaches believer's baptism in contrast to infant baptism, and that water baptism should be done by immersion rather than by sprinkling.

Gender roles
Terry Virgo holds to a complementarian view of gender roles.

Books
Virgo is the author of 14 books, including;
 No Well Worn Paths
 The spirit-filled church 
 God knows you're human 
 Start 
 God's Lavish Grace
 Does The Future Have a Church?
 The Tide is Turning
 The Church and You
 Restoration in the Church
 Men of Destiny
 Weak People, Mighty God
 Life Tastes Better

References

Bibliography
 .
 .
 .
 .
 ; first edition Guildford: Eagle.

External links
 .
 : Terry Virgo's home church.
 .
 Interview with Terry Virgo on Church by Mike Reeves
 Interview with Terry Virgo
 Terry Virgo preaching on Grace
 .
 

1940 births
Newfrontiers
Apostolic networks
Living people
People from Brighton
Founders of new religious movements
English Calvinist and Reformed Christians
English Charismatics
English evangelicals
British New Church Movement